Marc Polmans and Sergiy Stakhovsky were the defending champions but chose not to defend their title.

Alexander Erler and Lucas Miedler won the title after defeating Hunter Reese and Sem Verbeek 7–6(7–5), 7–5 in the final.

Seeds

Draw

References

External links
 Main draw

Ostra Group Open - Doubles
2022 Doubles